Yonathan Alexander Del Valle Rodríguez  (born 28 May 1990) is a Venezuelan professional footballer who plays as a striker for Turkish club Eyüpspor.

Club career
His first professional team was Carabobo FC, in which he didn't play too much due to his young age. Then he moved to Unión Atlético Maracaibo from which he exit after personal problems with the team. He signed with Deportivo Táchira on 2008, having more action and gaining more recognition to the point of being signed by Club Atlético Huracán from Argentina only to be sent back after no official matches with the team because the foreign spots in the team were already full.

In August 2011 Del Valle signed with AJ Auxerre, becoming the first Venezuelan player in Ligue 1.

Following relegation in the 2011-12 season, he moved from Auxerre on loan to the Portuguese Primeira Liga side Rio Ave on 12 July 2012.

International career
On 25 September 2009 he became the first Venezuelan to score a goal in a FIFA competition, having scored against Nigeria in the 2009 FIFA U-20 World Cup. Three days later he managed a hat-trick against Tahiti in the Venezuelan 8–0 victory.

Club statistics
Accurate as of 28 May 2013.

Honours

Club
Deportivo Táchira
 Venezuelan Primera División: 2010–11

References

External links
 
 
 

1990 births
Sportspeople from Valencia, Venezuela
Living people
Venezuelan footballers
Association football forwards
Venezuelan expatriate footballers
Venezuela international footballers
Venezuela under-20 international footballers
UA Maracaibo players
Deportivo Táchira F.C. players
AJ Auxerre players
Rio Ave F.C. players
F.C. Paços de Ferreira players
Kasımpaşa S.K. footballers
Bursaspor footballers
Bandırmaspor footballers
Ümraniyespor footballers
Eyüpspor footballers
Venezuelan Primera División players
Primeira Liga players
Süper Lig players
TFF First League players
Expatriate footballers in France
Expatriate footballers in Portugal
Expatriate footballers in Turkey
Venezuelan expatriate sportspeople in France
Venezuelan expatriate sportspeople in Portugal
Venezuelan expatriate sportspeople in Turkey
Copa América Centenario players